San Bernardino–Tippecanoe station is a rail station located on Tippecanoe Avenue in San Bernardino, California. The station opened on October 24, 2022 and is served directly by the Arrow rail line. Metrolink's San Bernardino Line express trains to  utilize the main track, but do not stop at this station.

References

External links 

Railway stations in the United States opened in 2022
Railway stations in San Bernardino County, California
Arrow stations